Mauri Mikael Eggert (born April 3, 1933) is a Finnish diplomat and Master of political science.

Eggert was born in Turku. He was Ambassador  of Finland to Hanoi from 1977 to 1980, Head of Department for Development Cooperation, 1981–1984, Ambassador to Egypt from 1984 to 1987, Inspector of the Judiciary 1987-1990 and Under-Secretary of State for Development from  1990 to 1993.

References

Ambassadors of Finland to Vietnam
Ambassadors of Finland to Egypt
Finnish diplomats
1933 births
People from Turku
Living people